Supai is a census-designated place (CDP) in Coconino County, Arizona, United States, within the Grand Canyon.

As of the 2010 census, the CDP had a population of 208. The capital of the Havasupai Indian Reservation, Supai is the only place in the United States where mail is still carried in and out by mules.

Supai has been referred to as "the most remote community" in the contiguous United States by the U.S. Department of Agriculture. It is accessible only by helicopter, on foot or by mule.

Recent history
Tourists and some residents were evacuated from Supai and surrounding area on August 17 and 18, 2008, due to flooding of Havasu Creek complicated by the failure of the earthen Redlands Dam (subsequent to the main flooding event) after a night of heavy rainfall. Evacuees were taken to Peach Springs, Arizona. More heavy rains were expected and a flash flood warning was put into effect, necessitating the evacuation, according to the National Park Service.  The floods were significant enough to attract coverage from international media.

Damage to the trails, bridges, and campground was severe enough for Havasupai to close visitor access to the village, campground, and falls until the spring of 2009. Further flooding in 2010 resulted in damage to repairs made previously and closures effective until May 2011. In July 2018, flash flooding forced the helicopter evacuation of 200 visitors. All tourism was suspended from March 2020 until February 2022 due to the COVID-19 pandemic.

Geography and climate

Located within the Grand Canyon, Supai is only accessible by foot, pack animal or helicopter. It is the only place in the United States where mules still carry the mail, most of which is food.

Climate
Supai has a semi-arid climate, with very hot summers coupled with mild nights, and relatively mild winters with nights cooling off to below freezing on many days.

Demographics
As of the census of 2010, there were 208 people and 43 households. The racial makeup of the CDP was 96.6% Native American, 0.5% White, 0.5% Other, and 2.4% of mixed race. Hispanic or Latino of any race were 4.3% of the population.

There were 43 households, out of which 34.9% were married families living together, 32.6% had a female householder with no husband present, 14.0% had a male householder with no wife present, and 18.6% were non-families. 16.3% of all households were made up of individuals, and 2.3% had someone living alone who was 65 years of age or older. The average household size was 4.84.

In the CDP the population was spread out, with 30.8% under the age of 16, 10.4% from 16 to 21, 54.8% from 21 to 65, and 4.8% who were 65 years of age or older. The median age was 25.2 years. 48.6% of the population was male; 51.4% was female.

Education

There is one K–6 school in Supai, Havasupai Elementary School, run by the Bureau of Indian Education.  it only offers mathematics and English classes.

In 1988, Havasupai ES was K-8, and residents went to boarding schools after the 8th grade. The most common boarding school, that year, was Sherman Indian High School in Riverside, California.

As of 2017, around 20% of the school's students graduate from high school.

According to Coconino County's parcel viewer, Supai is in the "Unorganized School District #00". According to Arizona law, an unorganized school district is one that does not have a high school.

Access

Supai can be reached by hiking , descending  in elevation from Hualapai Hilltop through the Hualapai Canyon. Alternatively, the AirWest Helicopters service schedules flights from Hualapai Hilltop to Supai.

Services

Supai has one small, air-conditioned lodge (Havasupai Lodge), a convenience store and a cafe.

References

External links

 Official Havasupai Tribe site

Havasupai
Census-designated places in Coconino County, Arizona
Road-inaccessible communities of Arizona